Peltospiridae is a small family of gastropods that used to belong to the clade Vetigastropoda (according to the taxonomy of the Gastropoda by Bouchet & Rocroi, 2005), but is now included in the clade Neomphalina

This family has no subfamilies.

Genera 
Genera within the family Peltospiridae:
Chrysomallon (1 species)
Ctenopelta (1 species)
 Depressigyra Warén & Bouchet, 1989
 Echinopelta McLean, 1989
 Hirtopelta McLean, 1989
 Lirapex Warén & Bouchet, 1989
 Nodopelta McLean, 1989
 Pachydermia Warén & Bouchet, 1989
 Peltospira McLean, 1989
 Rhynchopelta McLean, 1989

Cladogram
A cladogram based on sequences of cytochrome-c oxidase I (COI) genes showing phylogenic relations of Peltospiridae. Lacunoides and  Cyathermia are sometimes classified within Neomphalidae, but according to the COI genne analysis, they cluster within Peltospiridae.

References

External links